Tuzly Lagoons National Nature Park is a Protected area located in Bilhorod-Dnistrovskyi Raion of Odesa Oblast, southern Ukraine. The park was set up by decree of the President of Ukraine, Viktor Yushchenko, on January 1, 2010.

The territory of the National Park includes the group of Tuzly Lagoons: which consist of parts of the larger lagoons Shahany, Alibey, Burnas; and the small lagoons Solone Ozero, Khadzhyder, Karachaus, Budury, Martaza, Mahala, Malyi Sasyk, and Dzhantshey.

See also 
 Tuzly Lagoons

References

External links
 

Tuzly Lagoons
National parks of Ukraine
Ramsar sites in Ukraine
Geography of Odesa Oblast
Tourist attractions in Odesa Oblast
Bilhorod-Dnistrovskyi Raion